Platinum hexafluoride is the chemical compound with the formula PtF6, and is one of seventeen known binary hexafluorides. It is a dark-red volatile solid that forms a red gas. The compound is a unique example of platinum in the +6 oxidation state. With only four d-electrons, it is paramagnetic with a triplet ground state.  PtF6 is  a strong fluorinating agent and one of the strongest oxidants, capable of oxidising xenon and O2.  PtF6 is octahedral in both the solid state and in the gaseous state. The Pt-F bond lengths are 185 picometers.

Synthesis
PtF6 was first prepared by reaction of fluorine with platinum metal.  This route remains the method of choice.

Pt + 3 F2 → PtF6

PtF6 can also be prepared by disproportionation of the pentafluoride (PtF5), with the tetrafluoride (PtF4) as a byproduct. The required PtF5 can be obtained by fluorinating PtCl2:

2 PtCl2 + 5 F2 → 2 PtF5 + 2 Cl2
2 PtF5 → PtF6 + PtF4

Hexafluoroplatinates
Platinum hexafluoride can gain an electron to form the hexafluoroplatinate anion, . The discovery of this reaction in 1962 proved that noble gases form chemical compounds. Previous to the experiment with xenon,  had been shown to react with oxygen to form [O2]+[PtF6]−, dioxygenyl hexafluoroplatinate.

See also
 Hexafluoride
 Chloroplatinic acid

References

General reading 
 Holleman, A. F.; Wiberg, E. "Inorganic Chemistry" Academic Press: San Diego, 2001. .

Fluorides,6
Hexafluorides
Platinum group halides
Fluorinating agents
Octahedral compounds
Gases with color